Ea Knốp is a township of Ea Kar District, Đắk Lắk Province, Vietnam.

References

Populated places in Đắk Lắk province
Townships in Vietnam